Karl Bebendorf (born 7 May 1996) is a German track and field athlete. In 2019, he competed in the men's 3000 metres steeplechase event at the 2019 World Athletics Championships held in Doha, Qatar. He did not qualify to compete in the final.

In 2019, he finished in 7th place in the men's 1500 metres at the 2019 European Athletics Indoor Championships held in Glasgow, United Kingdom. In the same year, he won the gold medal in the men's 3000 metres steeplechase at the 2019 German Athletics Championships held in Berlin, Germany.

In 2021, he competed in the men's 1500 metres event at the 2021 European Athletics Indoor Championships held in Toruń, Poland. He also competed in the men's 3000 metres steeplechase event at the 2020 Summer Olympics held in Tokyo, Japan.

References

External links 
 

Living people
1996 births
German male middle-distance runners
German male steeplechase runners
World Athletics Championships athletes for Germany
German national athletics champions
Sportspeople from Dresden
Athletes (track and field) at the 2020 Summer Olympics
Olympic athletes of Germany
21st-century German people